Dean Wesley Smith (born November 10, 1950) is an American writer of science fiction, mystery, and fantasy. Smith has published nearly 200 novels and hundreds of short stories.

Smith has also written novels for licensed properties such as Star Trek, Spider-Man, X-Men, Men in Black, and many other gaming, television, and movie properties.

Smith's novel Laying the Music to Rest, was nominated for the 1990 Bram Stoker Award for Best First Novel. Smith's short story, In the Shade of the Slowboat Man, was nominated for the 1997 Nebula Award for Best Short Story.

He is married to fellow writer/editor Kristine Kathryn Rusch; they have collaborated on several works. Smith and Rusch operated Pulphouse Publishing for many years and edited the original (hardback) incarnation of Pulphouse Magazine; they won a World Fantasy Award in 1989.

Bibliography

Shadow Warrior 

For Dead Eyes Only, Pocket, October 1997

The Tenth Planet  
with Kristine Kathryn Rusch
 The Tenth Planet, Del Rey, 1999
 Oblivion, Del Rey, 2000
 The Final Assault, Del Rey, 2000

Pilgrim Hugh Incident

 The Case of the Intrusive Furniture, WMG Publishing, 2011
 Miss Smallwood's Goodies, WMG Publishing, 2011
 The Case of the Dead Lady Blues, WMG Publishing, 2016
 The Case of the Lost Treasure, WMG Publishing, 2016
 The Case of the Simple Passage, WMG Publishing, 2016

Doc Thriller
 Dead Money, WMG Publishing, 2013

Marble Grant 
 Whistle for Help: A Marble Grant Story, WMG Publishing, 9 May 2021
 The First Year: A Marble Grant Novel, WMG Publishing, 20 July 2021

Cold Poker Gang 

 Kill Game, WMG Publishing, May, 2014
 Cold Call, WMG Publishing, February, 2015
 Calling Dead, WMG Publishing, May, 2015
 Bad Beat, WMG Publishing, January, 2016
 Dead Hand, WMG Publishing, June, 2016
 Freezeout, WMG Publishing, October, 2016
 Ace High, WMG Publishing, February, 2017
 Burn Card, WMG Publishing, December, 2017
 Heads Up, WMG Publishing, November, 2019
 Ring Game, WMG Publishing, April 2020
 Bottom Pair, WMG Publishing, June 2021
 The Remarkable Way She Died, WMG Publishing, March 2021
 Under Glass, WMG Publishing, March 2021

Thunder Mountain 

 Thunder Mountain, WMG Publishing, January, 2014
 Monumental Summit, WMG Publishing, March, 2014
 Avalanche Creek, WMG Publishing, November, 2014
 The Edwards Mansion, WMG Publishing, January, 2015
 Lake Roosevelt, WMG Publishing, March, 2015
 Warm Springs, WMG Publishing, April, 2015
 Melody Ridge, WMG Publishing, December, 2015
 Grapevine Springs, WMG Publishing, April, 2016
 The Idanha Hotel, WMG Publishing, July, 2016
 The Taft Ranch, WMG Publishing, September, 2016
 Tombstone Canyon, WMG Publishing, December, 2017
 Dry Creek Crossing, WMG Publishing, December, 2017

Non-Fiction 

 Writing a Novel in Seven Days
 Heinlein's Rules
 How to Write Fiction Sales Copy
 Stages of a Fiction Writer
 Writing into the Dark
 Killing the Top Ten Sacred Cows of Publishing
 Killing the Top Ten Sacred Cows of Indie Publishing
 How to Write a Novel in Ten Days
 Think Like a Publisher
 The First Tee Panic

Smith's Monthly 

 Smith's Monthly #1, WMG Publishing, October, 2013
 Smith's Monthly #2, WMG Publishing, November, 2013
 Smith's Monthly #3, WMG Publishing, December, 2013
 Smith's Monthly #4, WMG Publishing, January, 2014
 Smith's Monthly #5, WMG Publishing, February, 2014
 Smith's Monthly #6, WMG Publishing, March, 2014
 Smith's Monthly #7, WMG Publishing, April, 2014
 Smith's Monthly #8, WMG Publishing, May, 2014
 Smith's Monthly #9, WMG Publishing, June, 2014
 Smith's Monthly #10, WMG Publishing, July, 2014
 Smith's Monthly #11, WMG Publishing, August, 2014
 Smith's Monthly #12, WMG Publishing, September, 2014
 Smith's Monthly #13, WMG Publishing, October, 2014
 Smith's Monthly #14, WMG Publishing, November, 2014
 Smith's Monthly #15, WMG Publishing, December, 2014
 Smith's Monthly #16, WMG Publishing, January, 2015
 Smith's Monthly #17, WMG Publishing, February, 2015
 Smith's Monthly #18, WMG Publishing, March, 2015
 Smith's Monthly #19, WMG Publishing, April, 2015
 Smith's Monthly #20, WMG Publishing, May, 2015
 Smith's Monthly #21, WMG Publishing, June, 2015
 Smith's Monthly #22, WMG Publishing, July, 2015
 Smith's Monthly #23, WMG Publishing, August, 2015
 Smith's Monthly #24, WMG Publishing, September, 2015
 Smith's Monthly #25, WMG Publishing, October, 2015
 Smith's Monthly #26, WMG Publishing, November, 2015
 Smith's Monthly #27, WMG Publishing, December, 2015
 Smith's Monthly #28, WMG Publishing, January, 2016
 Smith's Monthly #29, WMG Publishing, February, 2016
 Smith's Monthly #30, WMG Publishing, March, 2016
 Smith's Monthly #31, WMG Publishing, April, 2016
 Smith's Monthly #32, WMG Publishing, May, 2016
 Smith's Monthly #33, WMG Publishing, June, 2016
 Smith's Monthly #34, WMG Publishing, July, 2016
 Smith's Monthly #35, WMG Publishing, August, 2016
 Smith's Monthly #36, WMG Publishing, September, 2016
 Smith's Monthly #37, WMG Publishing, October, 2016
 Smith's Monthly #38, WMG Publishing, November, 2016
 'Smith's Monthly #39, WMG Publishing, December. 2016
 Smith's Monthly #40, WMG Publishing, January, 2017
 Smith's Monthly #41, WMG Publishing, February, 2017
 Smith's Monthly #42, WMG Publishing, March, 2017
 Smith's Monthly #43, WMG Publishing, April, 2017
 Smith's Monthly #44, WMG Publishing, May, 2017
 Smith's Monthly #45, WMG Publishing, January, 2021
 Smith's Monthly #46, WMG Publishing, February, 2021
 Smith's Monthly #47, WMG Publishing, March, 2021
 Smith's Monthly #48, WMG Publishing, April, 2021
 Smith's Monthly #49, WMG Publishing, May, 2021
 Smith's Monthly #50, WMG Publishing, June, 2021Smith's Monthly #51, WMG Publishing, July, 2021Smith's Monthly #52, WMG Publishing, August, 2021Smith's Monthly #53, WMG Publishing, September, 2021Smith's Monthly #54, WMG Publishing, October, 2021

Seeder's UniverseShadow in the City, WMG Publishing, Septembe, 2010Dust and Kisses, WMG Publishing, January, 2014Against Time, WMG Publishing, February, 2014Sector Justice, WMG Publishing, April, 2014Morning Song, WMG Publishing, August, 2014The High Edge, WMG Publishing, October, 2014Star Mist, WMG Publishing, February, 2016Star Rain,WMG Publishing, March, 2016Star Fall,WMG Publishing, November, 2016A Bad Patch of Humanity, WMG Publishing, March, 2016Dreaming Large, WMG Publishing, March, 2016A Matter for a Future Year, WMG Publishing, March, 2016Starburst, WMG Publishing, January, 2017A Billion Earths, WMG Publishing, March, 2021

Poker BoyThe Slot's of Saturn, WMG Publishing, 2014The Old Girlfriend of Doom, WMG Publishing, 2010Dead Even, WMG Publishing, 2010Gods Aren't Funny, WMG Publishing, 2016Gambling Hell, WMG Publishing, 2013Luck Be a Lady, WMG Publishing, 2010Sighed the Snake, WMG Publishing, 2012The Smoke That Doesn't Bark, WMG Publishing, 2012The War of Poker, WMG Publishing, 2013Daddy is an Undertaker, WMG Publishing, 2012Nonexistent No MOre, WMG Publishing, 2013Fighting the Fuzzy-Wuzzy, WMG Publishing, 2012Pink Shoes and Hot Chocolate, WMG Publishing, 2012Shootout in the Okey-Doke Casino, WMG Publishing, 2012Dried Up, WMG Publishing, 2012The Empty Mummy Murders, WMG Publishing, 2012Living Time, WMG Publishing, 2013Not Saleable For Sale, WMG Publishing, 2013Just Shoot Me Now, WMG Publishing, 2013For the Balance of a Heart, WMG Publishing, 2012A Night With a Forgotten God, WMG Publishing, 2016They're Back, WMG Publishing, 2016Gods Have History, WMG Publishing, 2016Leaking Away a Life, WMG Publishing, 2016The Rude Improbable Presumptive, WMG Publishing, 2016The Women of the Felt, WMG Publishing, 2011Poker Boy vs The Silicon Suckers, WMG Publishing, 2012Luck Be Ladies, WMG Publishing, 2019Playing a Hunch, WMG Publishing, 2020Mystery Cat, WMG Publishing, 2021The Portal of Wrong Love, WMG Publishing, 2021The Tenth Planet series, on which he collaborated with his wife, author Kristine Kathryn Rusch.

Smith's film novelizations include Final Fantasy: The Spirits Within, The Rundown, Steel, The Core, and X-Men.a
Other properties include Aliens, Roswell, Smallville, and Quantum Leap.

His Star Trek novels include original books in series adapted from five of the live action television series: the original series, The Next Generation, Deep Space Nine, Voyager and Enterprise. He has also written books in the Star Trek: Starfleet Corps of Engineers series, and has edited the contest anthology series, Star Trek: Strange New Worlds.

Smith's stories can also be found in almost 20 different anthologies, such as Journeys to the Twilight Zone (1992), The Book of Kings (1995), and Past Lives, Present Tense. He also wrote 4 books with his wife under the name Sandy Schofield.

In 1992, Smith was the founding publisher of Tomorrow Speculative Fiction before selling the magazine to editor Algis Budrys's UniFont.

 Collections A Poker Boy Christmas: A Poker Boy Collection, WMG Publishing, 9 November 2021.The End Might Be Interesting After All: Six Really, Really Whacked Out End-of-Things Stories, WMG Publishing, 9 November 2021.Too Strange for the Name: Six Really, Really, Really Whacked Out Stories with Sex, WMG Publishing, 9 November 2021A Case for Aliens: Six Really, Really, Really Whacked Out Alien Stories, WMG Publishing, 26 October 2021Fantasy Love: Six Really, Really, Really Whacked Out Love Stories, WMG Publishing, 26 October 2021Weird Crime: Six Really, Really, Really Whacked Out Crime Stories, WMG Publishing, 26 October 2021Time for Cool Madness: Six Really, Really, Really Strange Marble Grant Stories, WMG Publishing, 26 October 2021Holiday Insanity: Six Really, Really, Really, Whacked Out Holiday Stories, WMG Publishing, 26 October 2021A Billion Earths: A Seeders Universe Collection, WMG Publishing, 21 March 2021Luck Be Ladies: A Poker Boy Collection, WMG Publishing, 17 August 2019Alien Vibrations: Five Strange Science Fiction Short Stories, WMG Publishing, 29 December 2017The Case of Pilgrim Hugh: Five STrange Detective Stories, WMG Publishing, 18 April 2017

 Short Stories 
 Black Betsy • [Jukebox] (1994) (collected in Mike Resnick's alternate history anthology Alternate Outlaws)

Awards
Smith's novel Laying the Music to Rest, was nominated for the 1990 Bram Stoker Award for Best First Novel.
Smith's short story, In the Shade of the Slowboat Man'', was nominated for the 1997 Nebula Award for Best Short Story.

External links
Dean Wesley Smith's Official Homepage
Fantastic Fiction’s Page for Dean Wesley Smith
LibraryThing author profile

Living people
American science fiction writers
20th-century American novelists
21st-century American novelists
American male novelists
World Fantasy Award-winning writers
20th-century American male writers
21st-century American male writers
1950 births